Whitfordiodendron nieuwenhuisii is a species of flowering plant in the family Fabaceae, native to Borneo. It was first described by Johannes Jacobus Smith in 1906 as Millettia nieuwenhuisii. As with many other species now placed in the tribe Wisterieae, it has also been placed in the related genera Adinobotrys and Callerya.

References

Wisterieae
Flora of Borneo
Plants described in 1906